is a Japanese yuri light novel series, written by Mato Sato and illustrated by Nilitsu. SB Creative have released seven volumes since July 2019 under their GA Bunko imprint. A manga adaptation with art by Ryo Mitsuya has been serialized in Square Enix's seinen manga magazine Young Gangan since June 2020. It has been collected in three tankōbon volumes. Both the light novel and manga are licensed in North America by Yen Press. A 12-episode anime television series adaptation by J.C.Staff aired between  April and June 2022.

Synopsis

Setting
Long ago, wanderers called "Lost Ones" came from an alternate world known as "Japan", and each were given power beyond imagination titled "Pure Concepts". In this new world they created an advanced civilisation with heavy Japanese influences and for a time, this world prospered. However, it was discovered that with prolonged usage, the Lost Ones would lose control of their Pure Concepts, bringing disaster and calamity to the world. Even today, there exists four legendary disasters, dubbed "Human Errors", which effects continuously rage on: the Sword of Salt, which turned the whole Western continent into salt that is gradually melting into the sea; the Pandæmonium, a fog-like dead zone in the Southern archipelago from which monsters regularly emerge; the Mechanical Society, which controls the wild frontier in the East; and the Starhusk, which carved out the centre of the Northern continent and set it afloat. To prevent such calamities again, the summoning of Lost Ones has become strictly forbidden and heavily managed by the Faust, a class of Church members in society. Among the Faust are Executioners, members that wield magic – etheric powers – and set out to secretly assassinate any Lost Ones that may still appear.

Plot
Top-class Executioner Menou has been tasked with eliminating Akari Tokitō, a Lost One who has been summoned by King Grisarika of the Noblesse, the noble class. However, she fails and soon discovers that Akari possesses the Pure Concept of Time, making her capable of reversing her death even after she has been killed. Shocked and fearful, Menou sets out on a journey with Akari by her side, in hopes of finding a way of killing her.

Characters

A young priestess who specializes in hunting down and assassinating Lost Ones before they can become a threat. She is well aware that most of the Lost Ones she kills are innocents who have done nothing wrong, but her training dictates that they cannot be allowed to live as their Pure Concepts will ultimately corrupt them. Even prior to meeting Akari, she had recurring dreams about meeting her in Japan; now, she inevitably acts as Akari's escort while searching for a way to kill her.
As a child, Menou was one of the sole survivors of the Sword of Salt. However, the incident and the trauma left her soul "bleached", turning her into effectively an emotionless husk. She was then discovered by Flare, the top Executioner at that time, and taken in as her apprentice, her "Flarette". As an Executioner, Menou possesses full mastery over her ether and primarily wields a knife to kill. 

A Japanese high school student who was forcibly summoned to the world by King Grisarika. Her Pure Concept, [Time], allows her to control any and all elements time, including instinctively reversing time to revive herself if she is killed. She is initially portrayed as rather clumsy and air-headed, but also kind and trusting, leading her to easily trust Menou upon their first meeting as she believed that their encounter was fate. In truth, Akari has already made the world regress multiple times to prevent Menou's death, erasing her memories each time and leaving only a sense of déjà vu. She is deeply in love with Menou.

A young priestess and Menou's aide. She assists Menou on anything she needs during a mission, including reconnaissance, providing disguises, and providing support in battles. She has had a crush on Menou ever since they were childhood friends, and hence treasures the hair ribbons gifted to her dearly. With Menou insisting that she hide her presence from Akari, Momo begins to grow jealous at how close the two are getting. Like Menou, Momo has strong control over her ether and wields a wire saw.

The warrior princess of Grisarika. Rash and bold, Ashuna has little regard for her title or noble duties and prefers to seek out strong opponents to battle. She fights using a heavy sword that she can enchant with etheric flames.

A legendary priestess famed for incredible skill in magecraft as well as killing many Lost Ones. After saving a young Menou from a Lost One, Flare took her in as her apprentice.

The Archbishop of the Church. Orwell acts as Menou's direct superior and initially orders her to bring Akari to their capital of Garm so Akari can be executed. Menou later discovers that Orwell, having grown exhausted and disillusioned from her years of service, had been kidnapping young girls to drain their youth for herself, and now intends to use Akari to reverse time on her. Her plan fails and she is killed by Menou after she taps into Akari's Pure Concept, super-aging Orwell to death.

A high school student who was forcibly summoned to the world with Akari by King Grisarika. His Pure Concept is [Null], which allows him to completely destroy any object he wants. He was killed by Menou to prevent him from abusing his newly found power.

The daughter of Count Libelle, the ruler of the port city bearing his family's name, and a Lost One. Because she never inherited her mother's powers, people often scorned her and as a result Manon grew to seek death. Today, she leads a subversive group called The Fourth, who consider themselves a "liberated" social class of their own. While publicly naive and mild-mannered, she has a penchant for sadistic murder. In private, she is an older sister figure to Pandæmonium, whose blood she uses to produce destructive pills.

A Lost One that came to this world over several hundred years ago, although she appears like a ten-year-old child. Her Pure Concept is [Chaos], allowing her to create and control monsters, and this led to her becoming responsible for one of the Four Major Human Errors today. With her Pure Concept having completely corrupted her, Pandæmonium behaves like a little girl with no will of her own. Her blood is used by Manon to produce destructive pills.

Media

Light novels
The Executioner and Her Way of Life is written by Mato Sato and illustrated by Nilitsu. SB Creative have released seven volumes since July 2019 under their GA Bunko imprint. Yen Press licensed the series for English publication.

Manga
A manga adaptation with art by Ryo Mitsuya began serialization in Square Enix's Young Gangan magazine on June 5, 2020. The manga is also licensed in North America by Yen Press.

Anime
At the "GA Fes 2021" event livestream, it was announced that the series would be receiving an anime television series adaptation. The series is animated by J.C.Staff and directed by Yoshiki Kawasaki, making his directorial debut, with Shōgo Yasukawa supervising scripts, Keiko Tamaki designing characters, and Michiru composing the series' music. Egg Firm and SB Creative produced the series. It aired from April 2 to June 18, 2022, on Tokyo MX, BS11, and AT-X. The opening theme song is "Paper Bouquet" by Mili, while the ending theme song is "Tomoshibi Serenade" (Serenade by Lamplight) by ChouCho. Sentai Filmworks has licensed the series outside of Asia, and is streaming it on HIDIVE. Medialink licensed the series in Southeast Asia, South Asia, and Oceania minus Australia and New Zealand.

On May 11, 2022, HIDIVE announced that the series will receive an English dub, which premiered on May 20.

Episode list

See also
 Is It Wrong to Try to Pick Up Girls in a Dungeon?: Familia Chronicle, another light novel series illustrated by Nilitsu

Notes

References

External links
 
 
 

2019 Japanese novels
2022 anime television series debuts
Adventure anime and manga
Anime and manga based on light novels
Book series introduced in 2019
GA Bunko
Gangan Comics manga
Isekai anime and manga
Isekai novels and light novels
J.C.Staff
Light novels
Medialink
Seinen manga
Sentai Filmworks
Tokyo MX original programming
Yen Press titles
Yuri (genre) anime and manga
Yuri (genre) light novels